Dongola Airport  is an airport serving Dongola, the capital city of the Northern state in Sudan.

Facilities

Airlines and destinations

References

External links
 

Airports in Sudan
Northern (state)